In mathematics, a zeta function is (usually) a function analogous to the original example, the Riemann zeta function 
 

Zeta functions include:
 Airy zeta function, related to the zeros of the Airy function
 Arakawa–Kaneko zeta function
 Arithmetic zeta function
 Artin–Mazur zeta function of a dynamical system
 Barnes zeta function or double zeta function
 Beurling zeta function of Beurling generalized primes
 Dedekind zeta function of a number field
 Duursma zeta function of error-correcting codes
 Epstein zeta function of a quadratic form
 Goss zeta function of a function field
 Hasse–Weil zeta function of a variety
 Height zeta function of a variety
 Hurwitz zeta function, a generalization of the Riemann zeta function
 Igusa zeta function
 Ihara zeta function of a graph
 L-function, a "twisted" zeta function
 Lefschetz zeta function of a morphism
 Lerch zeta function, a generalization of the Riemann zeta function
 Local zeta function of a characteristic-p variety
 Matsumoto zeta function
 Minakshisundaram–Pleijel zeta function of a Laplacian
 Motivic zeta function of a motive
 Multiple zeta function, or Mordell–Tornheim zeta function of several variables
 p-adic zeta function of a p-adic number
 Prime zeta function, like the Riemann zeta function, but only summed over primes
 Riemann zeta function, the archetypal example 
 Ruelle zeta function
 Selberg zeta function of a Riemann surface
 Shimizu L-function
 Shintani zeta function
 Subgroup zeta function
 Witten zeta function of a Lie group
 Zeta function of an incidence algebra, a function that maps every interval of a poset to the constant value 1. Despite not resembling a holomorphic function, the special case for the poset of integer divisibility is related as a formal Dirichlet series to the Riemann zeta function.
 Zeta function of an operator or spectral zeta function

See also
Other functions called zeta functions, but not analogous to the Riemann zeta function
Jacobi zeta function
Weierstrass zeta function

Topics related to zeta functions
Artin conjecture
Birch and Swinnerton-Dyer conjecture
Riemann hypothesis and the generalized Riemann hypothesis. 
Selberg class S
Explicit formulae for L-functions

External links
 A directory of all known zeta functions

Mathematics-related lists